The DB Class V 51 (from 1968: DB Class 251) and DB Class V 52 (from 1968: DB Class 252) are classes of almost identical narrow gauge 4 axle diesel hydraulic locomotives built in 1964 for the Deutsche Bundesbahn, being built for  and  gauge lines respectively.

Both are outwardly similar to the standard gauge DB Class V 100 and were built to replace steam locomotives on the narrow gauge lines in Baden-Württemberg.

Due to partial line closures the locomotives did not work for long for the Deutsche Bundesbahn, subsequently working for different private companies in Italy, Spain and Austria.

Background

In the early 1960s the narrow gauge railways of Baden-Württemberg were still operated by 13 outdated steam locomotives.

Development and design
Thus the Deutsche Bundesbahn was asked to provide locomotives with suitably low axle load, suitable for both freight and passenger work, and which were suitable for use on small radius curves. High speed was not a primary requirement, more so on ease of maintenance and a reliable design.

The Gmeinder company in Mosbach / Baden put forward a design for a 4 axle, twin-bogeyd machine, which was similar to the MaK 400 BB machines made in 1959 for the Alsen´sche Portland-Cementfabrik KG in Itzehoe which had a gauge of  - having similar power transmission via a hydraulic gearbox.

Both classes shared the same design: a four axle narrow-gauge diesel locomotive with two two-axle bogies which was at the time a modern design. All machines had two MWM diesels each with an output of  @ 1600 rpm. located in the longer end, with the shorter end containing the auxiliary diesel engine, the batteries, the compressor and the diesel tanks.

The transmission was via a torque converter type "TwinDisc 11500 MS450" with a MaK produced final drive of the type MaK 3.162.04.

The starting tractive effort is  - remarkable for such a small locomotive. The Sifa safety system was fitted but not Indusi because of the slow speeds the trains used on the branch lines.

Construction
In 1963 Gmeinder was given a license to build the locomotives and the construction went smoothly, with the three V 51, and the two V 52 locomotives being delivered in 1964, both being identical in all but the wheelsets. Both classes were numbered from 900 onwards - narrow gauge steam engines had class numbers 900 upwards.

Work history

Class V 51
The three  gauge diesels locomotives were delivered in 1964 to their respective lines: V 51 901 to the Federseebahn, V 51 902 to  Schmalspurbahn Biberach-Warthausen-Ochsenhausen (narrow gauge railway of Warthausen, Ochsenhausen and Biberach) and V 51 903 to the Bottwartalbahn, where they replaced the old steam engines.

All three locomotives performed well in their respective duties. However such trouble free operation could not stop the decline of the Baden-Wuerttemberg narrow gauge lines, in 1964 the Federseebahn closed. The Bottwartalbahn was also closed despite having substantial rush hour traffic.

In 1968 the V 51 locomotives became DB Class 251 (and the V 52 machines - Class 252).

In 1970 both displaced locomotives went to the Biberach an der Riß-Ochsenhausen line to replace steam locomotives (99 633 from bad Buchau remained as a single replacement steam engine); at that time the line still had substantial freight operations; the refrigerator factory of the Liebherr Group in Ochsenhausen assured the continued operation of freight using (Roll-blocks) for almost 20 years after the end of passenger traffic and the closure (and removal) of the section to Warthausen.

As of 2008 it was still operating in working order.

251 902 and 251 903 continued working on the Biberach to Ochsenhausen line, pulling freight trains, until its closure of the trail on the 31st of March 1983.

251 902 remained on the Warthausen-Ochsenhausen line after the official closure and continued work there under its new guise as the "Oechsle" Museumsbahn (heritage railway) In 1996 the locomotive was withdrawn.

Class V 52
The two V 52  gauge locomotives were delivered in 1964 to the narrow gauge Schmalspurbahn Mosbach-Mudau (Mosbach-Mudau) line (the Odenwaldexpreß) to replace the 4 steam locomotives that were working there.

Despite working well the new diesels could not stop the decline of the minor routes of the state of Baden-Württemberg: The line from Mosbach to Mudau still had good levels of freight traffic, but passenger use was not so good; consequently the use of the V 52s on its  single track did not last as long as was originally intended.

The two locomotives remained on the Mosbach-Mudau; being suited to freight work; and because of five manufacturing companies using the line at Sattelbach and Krumbach Limbach.  Roll-blocks were used to transport standard gauge freight wagons on the meter gauge track. Additionally both were still used for passenger trains, which were worked with four passenger cars procured with state funds in 1965.

From 1968 the locomotives were reclassified as DB Class 252

Nevertheless, despite the freight work and dieselisation in 1973 the line closed. Both units rebuilt to standard gauge and sold to local private rail companies to recover the state grant which was used in their purchase.

As part of the rebuilding at Gmeinder the cab of 252 901 was broadened giving an unusual and unharmonic appearance. It went as '62' to the Albtalbahn in Karlsruhe.

In 1974 the second locomotive 252 902 (ex V 52 902) became "VL 46-01" on the Südwestdeutsche Eisenbahn-Gesellschaft mbH (SWEG) (Southwest German railway company)  (since 1984: Southwest Deutsche Verkehrs-Aktiengesellschaft) and worked on the Kaiserstuhlbahn.

In 1985, both engines were sold via the handling company NEWAG in Oberhausen to the Italian company Gleismac Italiana SpA in Gazzo di Bigarello (Mantua). From there, in 1987, 252 901 went without any structural changes to the construction company Francesco Ventura SrL in Paola (southern Italy) where it was numbered as "7152 T".

252 902 was converted back to meter gauge (in which the original appearance was restored) and sold to the narrow-gauge Ferrovia Genova-Casella (FGC) (Genoa) in 1986, later in the 1990s work was undertaken on it to enable a snow plow to be fitted. The locomotive has been restored between 2008 and 2015 by the Italian company Tesmec based in Monopoli (BA) and is actually (2021) in working conditions.

References and notes

Sources
MaK - Ein weiteres Typenprogramm (400 C / 400 BB / 500 C)  Mak - Type program 400C / 400BB / 500C Technical data and work history for license built derivatives V 51 and V 52 loks-aus-kiel.de
DB V 51
Das Öchsle :Biberach - Ochsenhausen - Die Baureihe V 51 The Biberach-Ochsenhausen narrow gauge railway : The Class V 51 - history and design information schmalspureisenbahnen.de
Gmeinder V51/251 brief history and technical data privat-bahn.de
DB V 52
Mosbach - Mudau : Die Baureihe V 52 Mosbach to Mudau railway : The Class V 52 - history and design information schmalspureisenbahnen.de
Gmeinder V52/252 brief history and technical data privat-bahn.de

External links

Images of Class V 51 001 christianseisenbahnseiten.com
Image of ex. V 51 003 under COMSA ownership ruehl-net.de

750 mm gauge locomotives
Metre gauge diesel locomotives
V 051
B-B locomotives
Railway locomotives introduced in 1964
Diesel-hydraulic locomotives of Germany

de:DB-Baureihe V 52